John James McGrath (October 8, 1919 – November 6, 1955) was an American racecar driver. McGrath died in an accident at Bobby Ball Memorial, he lost control of his car at Turn 3, crashed and flipped, dying instantly.

Biography
McGrath was born in Los Angeles, California, and grew up in South Pasadena, California.

A major player in the "mighty midgets" at Los Angeles's Gilmore Speedway in the late 1940s, McGrath won the first CRA (California Roadster Association) championship in 1946 and was dubbed "King of the Hot Rods".  His efforts, along with those of friend and teammate Manuel Ayulo, helped establish track roadsters as viable race cars. The west coast roadsters evolved into sprint cars in the early 1950s.

Major wins at the AAA national level included the 1951 Syracuse and Langhorne 100 mile races, the 1952 Syracuse 100, and the 1953 Milwaukee 200. He finished the 1952 and 1953 AAA championship seasons in second place, and led the first 44 laps of the 1954 Indianapolis 500.

McGrath's storied 26-lap duel with Bill Vukovich in the ill-fated 1955 Indianapolis 500 ended when the magneto on his Hinckle Special Kurtis 500C's Offenhauser (Meyer-Drake) engine failed on lap 54. Fellow Californian and two-time Indy winner Vukovich died three laps later in a chain-reaction crash while in the lead.

The "Splendid Splinter" himself was killed in the final AAA dirt-track race of the 1955 season, the Bobby Ball Memorial at the one-mile dirt oval at the Arizona State Fairgrounds in Phoenix, Arizona.

Complete AAA Championship Car results

Indy 500 results

McGrath's starting positions from 1951 to 1955 represent the best 5-year starting position streak in the Roadster Era.
McGrath was the fastest overall qualifier of the Roadster Era.
Although McGrath twice posted the fastest qualifying speed, he started from the pole only once when he was the first driver ever to crack the 140-mile-per-hour mark. That was in 1954, with Jimmy Daywalt and 1958 Indy 500 winner Jimmy Bryan to his right. In 1955, he started on the outside of the first row behind pole-day qualifiers Jerry Hoyt and Tony Bettenhausen.

World Championship career summary
The Indianapolis 500 was part of the FIA World Championship from 1950 through 1960. Drivers competing at Indy during those years were credited with World Championship points and participation. Jack McGrath participated in 6 World Championship races. He started on the pole once, set 1 fastest lap, and finished on the podium twice. He accumulated a total of 9 championship points.

Sources
Ludvigsen, K.: Indy Cars of the 1950s; Hudson, Wisconsin: Iconografix, 2000.
Popely, R.; Riggs, L. S.: Indianapolis 500 Chronicles; Lincolnwood, Illinois: Publications International, 1998.
Scalzo, J.: City of Speed: Los Angeles and the Rise of American Racing; St. Paul, Minnesota: MBI Publishing, 2007.
Vintage section of the Open Wheel Racers 3 website.

References

External links 
 

1919 births
1955 deaths
Indianapolis 500 drivers
Indianapolis 500 polesitters
Racing drivers from Los Angeles
Racing drivers who died while racing
Sports deaths in Arizona
AAA Championship Car drivers
World Sportscar Championship drivers
Carrera Panamericana drivers